is a national university at Nara, Nara, Japan. The predecessor of the school was founded in 1888, and it was chartered as a university in 1949.

Location 
The campus is located close to Nara Park, Tōdai-ji with a great statue of Buddha, Kasuga-taisha, and Kōfuku-ji, as well as Naramachi, the old town area in the central Nara City.

Organization

Faculty (Undergraduate Programs) 
Faculty of Education (教育学部)
Department of Teacher Training and School Education
Educational Progress
Pedagogy
Psychology
Early Childhood Education
Special Support Education
Curriculum and Instruction
Japanese
Social Studies
Mathematics
Science
Music
Fine Arts
Health & Sports Science
Home Economics
Technology
English
Traditional Culture
Calligraphy
Cultural Heritage

Graduate school 
Graduate School of Education (大学院教育学研究科)
Master's Program in Education
School Education
Curriculum and Instruction
Professional Degree Program in Education
School of Professional Development in Education

Postgraduate Course 
Special Course for Teachers for Special Education (特別支援教育特別専攻科)

Attached Organizations 
Educational and Academic Support Organization
Teacher Education Center for Future Generation
Library
Center for Intercultural Exchange and Studies
Center for Special Needs Education
Center for Education Research of Science and Mathematics
Center for Natural Environment Education
Health Care Center

Attached Schools 
University Attached Junior High School
University Attached Elementary School
University Attached Kindergarten

Facilities

Takabatake Campus (Main Campus) 
Takabatake-cho, Nara, Nara
 Faculty of Education
 Graduate School of Education
 University Attached Elementary School
 University Attached Kindergarten
 University Attached Junior High School (Special Needs Class)
 Educational and Academic Support Organization
 Health Care Center

University Attached Junior High School (Main School) 
2052-8 Houren-cho, Nara, Nara

Nara Practice Field, Center for Natural Environment Education 
Byakugoji-cho, Nara, Nara

Okuyoshino Practice Forest, Center for Natural Environment Education 
Oto-cho, Gojo, Nara

International Student House 
1252 Takabatake-cho, Nara, Nara

Student House (Tachibana House) 
864 Kidera-cho, Nara, Nara

Image character 

 Nakkyon (なっきょん)

References

External links
 Official website

Educational institutions established in 1888
Japanese national universities
Universities and colleges in Nara Prefecture
1888 establishments in Japan
Teachers colleges in Japan